Fano Frank Shimasaki (3 November 1913 – 13 September 1984) was an American Samoan chief, civil servant, clergyman and politician. He served as a Senator between 1969 and 1972.

Biography
Shimasaki was born in Faga'alu in 1913, the son of Japanese businessman Masaitchido Shimasaki and his Samoan wife, Fano Solinuu Shimasaki, who was the first woman to serve in the American Samoa Senate.

In 1937, Shimasaki began working for the government, initially as a bus driver, before becoming head mechanic of the government motor pool. He spent two years in Hawaii at the Pearl Harbor shipyard before returning to American Samoa to manage the motor pool, a job he held until retiring in 1975. He was given the chiefly title Fano in 1947 and was also a deacon in the Christian Congregational Church at Faga'alu.

In 1968 he was elected to the Senate from Maoputasi County. He was re-elected in 1970, serving until 1972. He died in Pago Pago in September 1984 at the age of 71.

References

1913 births
1984 deaths
American Samoan civil servants
American Samoan clergy
American Samoan chiefs
American Samoa Senators
20th-century American politicians
20th-century American clergy
American Samoan people of Japanese descent